Pietro Bellotti (1625–1700) was an Italian painter active in the Baroque period.

Life and Work
Bellotti was born in Volciano di Salò in 1627 (1625 according to Orlandi), he gained fame as a painter of portraits and heads of characters. He was a pupil of Girolamo Forabosco in Venice. According to Orlandi he worked for Cardinal Mazzarino, Cardinal Ottoboni (the future Pope Alexander VIII), for the elector of Bavaria and others. He was patronized by Pope Alexander VIII and by the Duke of Uceda. In Mantova he was "superintendent of the city and villa galleries"for Gorizaga. After wandering from court to court he returned to Lake Garda and died in poverty in Gargnano in 1700.

His principal works are: 
 La Parca Lachesi, from 1654, at the Museum of Stuttgart (replica, signed and dated 1684, at the Pinacoteca di Feltre); 
The Parcae Lachesis, private collection, Brescia; 
 Self-Portrait, signed and dated 1658, at the Uffizi Gallery, where he is depicted with a cup in his hand and a scroll with the inscription: "Hinc Hilaritas"; 
 Two Peasants' Heads at the Pinacoteca di Bologna;
 Philosopher in the Pinacoteca di Feltre; 
 Old Head at the Correr Museum; 
 Medea at the Accademia dei Concordi in Rovigo; 
 Maiden with a Turban in the Braunschweig Museum.

He shares the same name with the younger brother of Bernardo Bellotto, a Venetian vedute painter, nephew of Canaletto. This Pietro was born on 22 March 1725 in Venice, and after collaborating with the two painters above, moved to Toulouse, France, where he was active in the local Royal academy, as well as in Nantes (1755,1768), Besançon (1761), Lille (1778-1779), and Paris. In France, he was referred, by a number of names, including le Sieur Canalety and Pietro Bellotti di Caneletty. He is also referred as Belloti, Belloty, Beloty, or Bellottit. He died in France before 1805.

Bibliography

References

1625 births
1700 deaths
17th-century Italian painters
Italian male painters
18th-century Italian painters
Painters from Venice
Italian Baroque painters
18th-century Italian male artists